Khronos is the sixth full-length album by Greek extreme metal band Rotting Christ.

Following Sleep of the Angels, this record continues to show the band's experimentation with doom and gothic metal musical elements, but also a return to their more extreme earlier years as well. Some traces of industrial music can also be heard, particularly in the band's cover of Current 93's "Lucifer Over London", but also on other tracks as "Glory of Sadness".

It was produced by Peter Tägtgren's (Hypocrisy) Abyss Studios, whose previous credits also include releases by Dimmu Borgir and Immortal.

Track listing
All songs written by Sakis Tolis, except where noted. 
"Thou Art Blind" – 2:47
"If It Ends Tomorrow" – 4:28
"My Sacred Path" – 5:38
"Aeternatus" – 3:14
"Art of Sin" – 5:18
"Lucifer Over London" (David Tibet) – 5:15
"Law of the Serpent" – 2:08
"You Are I" – 3:27
"Khronos" – 6:37
"Fateless" – 4:10
"Time Stands Still" – 5:04
"Glory of Sadness" – 11:32
"Phobia [Brazil Edition]" – 5:34

Credits
Sakis Tolis – guitar, vocals
Kostas Vassilakopoulos – guitar
Andreas Lagios – bass
Georgios Tolias – keyboards
Themis Tolis – drums

References

2000 albums
Rotting Christ albums
Albums produced by Peter Tägtgren
Century Media Records albums